Jon Pollard may refer to:

 Jonathan Pollard, a former civilian intelligence analyst who was convicted of spying for Israel
 Jon Pollard (actor), Australian actor in Doom Runners (1997)

See also
 John Pollard (disambiguation)
 Jon
 Pollard (disambiguation)